(+)-copalyl-diphosphate diphosphate-lyase may refer to:
 Levopimaradiene synthase, an enzyme
 Phyllocladan-16alpha-ol synthase, an enzyme